Eustace Edward Ricardo Braithwaite (June 27, 1912 – December 12, 2016), publishing as E. R. Braithwaite, was a Guyanese-born British-American novelist, writer, teacher and diplomat best known for his stories of social conditions and racial discrimination against black people. He was the author of the 1959 autobiographical novel To Sir, With Love, which was made into a 1967 British drama film of the same title, starring Sidney Poitier and Lulu.

Early life
Braithwaite was born in Georgetown, Guyana, on June 27, 1912. Both of his parents had gone to Oxford University and he described growing up surrounded by education, achievement and parental pride. His father was a gold and diamond miner, and his mother was a homemaker. He attended Saint Ambrose Primary School, Queen's College, Guyana, and then City College of New York (1940). During World War II he joined the Royal Air Force as a pilot.  He later described this experience in To Sir, With Love as one where he had felt no discrimination based on his skin colour nor ethnicity. He went on to attend Gonville and Caius College, Cambridge (1949), where he earned a master's degree in physics.

Career
After the war, despite his extensive training, Braithwaite could not find work in his field and, disillusioned, reluctantly took up a job as a school teacher in the East End of London. The book To Sir, With Love (1959) was based on his experiences there. It won an Anisfield-Wolf Book Award. To Sir, with Love was adapted into a film of the same title, starring Sidney Poitier. Although the film was a box-office success, many critics, and Braithwaite himself, considered it too sentimental. He also objected to the main character's mixed-race romance being given lower prominence in the film version. In 2007 he said on a BBC Radio 4 programme, To Sir, with Love Revisited, written and presented by Burt Caesar: "I detest the movie from the bottom of my heart."

While he was writing his book about the school Braithwaite turned to social work. It became his job to find foster homes for non-white children for the London County Council. This experience resulted in Paid Servant: A Report About Welfare Work in London, published in the UK in 1962. Braithwaite continued to write novels and short stories throughout his long international career as an educational consultant and lecturer for UNESCO. 

He was the first Permanent Representative of Guyana to the United Nations from 1967 to 1969. He was elected to the presidency of the United Nations Council for South West Africa in 1968. He later served as Guyana's Ambassador to Venezuela.

In 1973 South Africa lifted its ban on Braithwaite's books and he subsequently visited the country. While there he was granted the status of "honorary white", which gave him significantly more freedom of movement than the indigenous black population but less than the whites, a situation he found detestable. He recorded the experiences he witnessed during the six weeks he spent in South Africa in his book Honorary White (London: The Bodley Head, 1975).

He taught English studies at New York University and in 2002 was a writer-in-residence at Howard University, Washington, D.C. He associated himself with Manchester Community College (Connecticut), during the 2005–06 academic year as a visiting professor. He also served as the college's commencement speaker for that year and received an honorary degree.

He turned 100 in 2012, and on a visit to Guyana, in his capacity as the patron of the Inter-Guiana Cultural Festival, he was given a national award, the Cacique Crown of Honour, by then-President Donald Ramotar.

In 2013, Braithwaite attended the first live performance of To Sir, With Love. The production was written by Ayub Khan Din for the stage as part of Royal & Derngate, Northampton's Made In Northampton season. The play was directed by Mark Babych and starred Ansu Kabia in the title role and Matthew Kelly.  This was the first theater-adoption of the book.

Personal life and death
Braithwaite lived in Washington, D.C. with his partner, Genevieve Ast.

Braithwaite died at the Adventist HealthCare Shady Grove Medical Center in Rockville, Maryland, on December 12, 2016, at the age of 104.

Selected bibliography
 To Sir, With Love (1959)  
 Paid Servant (1962)
 A Kind of Homecoming (1962)
 Choice of Straws (1965)
 Reluctant Neighbors (1972)
 Honorary White (1975) 
 Billingsly: The Bear With The Crinkled Ear (2014)

See also
List of teachers portrayed in films
List of centenarians (authors, poets and journalists)

References

External links
Manchester Community College News Item on E. R. Braithwaite
Susie Thomas's article on the London Fictions site about To Sir, with Love
Onyekachi Wambu (1998), Black British Literature since Windrush. BBC
BBC 7 listing for 17/18 Oct 2008
Manchester, CT, Community College News Archive (February 3, 2006), Dr. Edward R. Braithwaite author of “To Sir, With Love” Named Visiting Professor at MCC
 E R Braithwaite at the British Library
 "Guyanese novelist E.R. Braithwaite awarded Cacique Crown of Honour", Capitol News, August 23, 2012. YouTube.

1912 births
2016 deaths
People from Georgetown, Guyana
Royal Air Force personnel of World War II
Guyanese centenarians
Guyanese novelists
Men centenarians
Black British writers
Alumni of Queen's College, Guyana
Alumni of Gonville and Caius College, Cambridge
Permanent Representatives of Guyana to the United Nations
Ambassadors of Guyana to Venezuela
Guyanese people of World War II
20th-century male writers
Guyanese expatriates in the United Kingdom
Guyanese expatriates in the United States